The Imperial Orthodox Palestine Society (ИППО), is a scholarly organization for the study of the Middle East, founded on 8 May 1882 by , after the approval of Alexander III. The Society's activities expanded considerably so that it held over 30,000 meetings during 1902.

It was reformed and reapproved in 1919, 1922, 1925, 1930, 1952, 1986, 1989, 1992, 2002 and 2003. In 1918, following the Russian Revolution of 1917, the society was renamed the Russian Palestine Society and attached to the Academy of Sciences of the USSR. Its original name was restored by the society on 22 May 1992.

Today it is active both within the Russian Federation as well as abroad.
These branches operate in cities abroad:
 Varna, (Bulgaria)
 Bethlehem, Palestine
 Jerusalem, Israel
 Kyiv, Ukraine
 Larnaca, Cyprus
 Amman, Jordan

In September 2008, the government of Israel decided to return to Russia the building which used to house the guest house of Saint Sergius for Russian Orthodox visitors to Jerusalem, also known as the Mission of Saint Sergius of Jerusalem and which had previously housed Israel's Ministry of Agriculture. It belonged, up to the October Revolution, to the Imperial Palestine Society, while among its main donors was Grand Duke Sergei Alexandrovich. The decision came into force in February 2009.

In December 2019, the Israeli Justice Ministry transferred the historical  with the Alexander Nevsky Church, Jerusalem to the Putin-allied Imperial Orthodox Palestine Society from the competing Imperial Orthodox Palestine Historic Society, which many commentators linked to negotiating Issachar's release.

History

References

1882 establishments in the Russian Empire
Learned societies of Russia
Russian diaspora in Israel
Russian diaspora in the State of Palestine